2015 Turkish Super Cup (Turkish: TFF Süper Kupa) is the 42nd edition of the Turkish Super Cup since its establishment as Presidential Cup in 1966. The match is contested between both the 2014–15 Süper Lig and 2014–15 Turkish Cup champions Galatasaray and the 2014–15 Turkish Cup runner-up Bursaspor.

Background
The fixture is the 6th overall national super cup matchup between the teams since 1966. Galatasaray last won the cup in 2013 against Fenerbahçe, and Bursaspor never won the cup since 1966, but they were finalist in 2010.

Path to the final
Galatasaray were champions in the regular season, finishing 3 points ahead of Fenerbahçe. In the regular season Galatasaray collected 77 points by 24 wins, 5 draws, and 5 losses. They were trailed by Fenerbahçe, who collected 74 points by 22 wins, 8 draws, and 4 losses.

Bursaspor performed better in the domestic cup. They entered the tournament at the third round. They won their third round match against Tepecikspor. In the group stage they were drawn against Mersin İdmanyurdu, Fatih Karagümrük, and Samsunspor but were first position in the group. In the round of 16, they beat  İstanbul Başakşehir. They won their quarter final match against Gençlerbirliği. The semi-finals were the toughest home and away matches for Bursaspor, as they struggled against Fenerbahçe S.K. (football) but were winners. In the 2015 Turkish Cup Final, Galatasaray defeated Bursaspor, but Bursaspor gained a ticket for Turkish Super Cup final, since Galatasaray is the champion of the league.

Match

Details

References

2015
Super Cup
Super Cup 2015
Super Cup 2015